Fo Tan is one of the 36 constituencies in the Sha Tin District in Hong Kong.

The constituency returns one district councillor to the Sha Tin District Council, with an election every four years. The seat has been currently held by independent Scarlett Pong.

Fo Tan constituency is loosely based on area of Fo Tan with an estimated population of 16,982.

Councillors represented

1982 to 1985

1991 to present

Election results

2010s

2000s

1990s

1980s

References

Fo Tan
Constituencies of Hong Kong
Constituencies of Sha Tin District Council
1982 establishments in Hong Kong
Constituencies established in 1982
Constituencies disestablished in 1985
1985 disestablishments in Hong Kong
1991 establishments in Hong Kong
Constituencies established in 1991